Beimbet Mailin previously Taran is a district of Kostanay Region in northern Kazakhstan. The administrative center of the district is the selo of Taran. Population:   . 10% of the population are Kazakhstan Germans.

References

Districts of Kazakhstan
Kostanay Region